The Autobiography of Miss Jane Pittman is an American television film based on the novel of the same name by Ernest J. Gaines. The film was broadcast on CBS on 
Thursday, January 31, 1974.

Directed by John Korty, the screenplay was written by Tracy Keenan Wynn and executive produced by Roger Gimbel. It stars Cicely Tyson in the lead role, as well as Michael Murphy, Richard Dysart, Katherine Helmond, and Odetta. The film was shot in Baton Rouge, Louisiana, and was notable for its use of very realistic special effects makeup by Stan Winston and Rick Baker for the lead character, who is shown from ages 23 to 110. The film is distributed through Classic Media.

Synopsis
The time is the early 1960s Civil Rights Movement. Jane, a former slave, is celebrating her 110th birthday. Two men tell her that a little girl is going to a segregated water fountain; she gets arrested because she is black. The next day Jane is interviewed by a journalist and she tells the story of her life. The climax of the story shows Jane going to the water fountain to desegregate it; her lifespan has bridged the time of slavery and the Civil Rights Movement.

Cast

Cicely Tyson as Jane Pittman
Richard Dysart as Master Bryant
Odetta as Big Laura
Michael Murphy as Quentin Lerner
Rod Perry as Joe Pittman
Arnold Wilkerson as Jimmy
Will Hare as Albert Cluveau
Katherine Helmond as Lady at House
Thalmus Rasulala as Ned Douglas
Barbara Chaney as Amma Dean

Awards
 Directors Guild of America Award
 Nine Emmy Awards
 Actress of the Year (Cicely Tyson)
 Best Directing in Drama, A Single Program - Comedy or Drama
 Best Lead Actress in a Drama (Cicely Tyson)
 Best Music Composition for a Special Program (Fred Karlin)
 Best Writing in Drama, Adaptation (Tracy Keenan Wynn)
 Outstanding Achievement in Costume Design (Bruce Walkup and Sandra Stewart)
 Outstanding Achievement in Makeup (Stan Winston and Rick Baker)
 Outstanding Limited Series (Robert Christiansen and Rick Rosenberg)
Outstanding Achievement in Any Area of Creative Technical Crafts (Lynda Gurasich, hairstylist)
 Nominated for a BAFTA award
 Best Actress (Cicely Tyson)

See also
 Mama Flora's Family, 1998 historical fiction film in which Tyson also leads the cast

References

External links

1974 television films
1974 films
CBS network films
Films about American slavery
Films based on American novels
Films directed by John Korty
Films scored by Fred Karlin
1970s English-language films